Porimin is a protein that in humans is encoded by the TMEM123 gene.

This gene encodes a highly glycosylated transmembrane protein with a high content of threonine and serine residues in its extracellular domain, similar to a broadly defined category of proteins termed mucins. 

Exposure of some cell types to anti-PORIMIN (pro-oncosis receptor inducing membrane injury) antibody, crosslinks this protein on the cell surface and induces a type of cell death termed oncosis. 

Oncosis is distinct from apoptosis and is characterized by a loss of cell membrane integrity without DNA fragmentation. This gene product is proposed to function as a cell surface receptor that mediates cell death.

References

Further reading